Kawakawa Bay is an east coast bay and settlement in the Franklin area of New Zealand's Auckland Region.

It is located on the western side and northern end of the Firth of Thames, the southern side of the Hauraki Gulf, and north of the Hunua Ranges.

The bay takes its name from Kawakawa trees which line the coastline.

The beach is used for swimming, fishing and boating, and has views of Hauraki Gulf islands like Waiheke Island.

Tawhitokino Beach is accessible via a small boat or kayak, or a 60 minute walk.

Demographics
It is part of the larger Kawakawa Bay-Orere statistical area.

Kawakawa Bay had a population of 666 at the 2018 New Zealand census, an increase of 66 people (11.0%) since the 2013 census, and an increase of 81 people (13.8%) since the 2006 census. There were 255 households, comprising 333 males and 345 females, giving a sex ratio of 0.97 males per female, with 108 people (16.2%) aged under 15 years, 99 (14.9%) aged 15 to 29, 330 (49.5%) aged 30 to 64, and 135 (20.3%) aged 65 or older.

Ethnicities were 90.1% European/Pākehā, 18.9% Māori, 5.9% Pacific peoples, 1.8% Asian, and 2.3% other ethnicities. People may identify with more than one ethnicity.

Although some people chose not to answer the census's question about religious affiliation, 58.1% had no religion, 30.2% were Christian, 1.4% were Hindu and 2.7% had other religions.

Of those at least 15 years old, 81 (14.5%) people had a bachelor's or higher degree, and 132 (23.7%) people had no formal qualifications. 123 people (22.0%) earned over $70,000 compared to 17.2% nationally. The employment status of those at least 15 was that 300 (53.8%) people were employed full-time, 81 (14.5%) were part-time, and 24 (4.3%) were unemployed.

Kawakawa Bay-Orere

Kawakawa Bay-Orere had a population of 1,992 at the 2018 New Zealand census, an increase of 252 people (14.5%) since the 2013 census, and an increase of 246 people (14.1%) since the 2006 census. There were 765 households, comprising 987 males and 1,002 females, giving a sex ratio of 0.99 males per female. The median age was 47.6 years (compared with 37.4 years nationally), with 348 people (17.5%) aged under 15 years, 282 (14.2%) aged 15 to 29, 996 (50.0%) aged 30 to 64, and 369 (18.5%) aged 65 or older.

Ethnicities were 89.9% European/Pākehā, 16.7% Māori, 3.9% Pacific peoples, 2.7% Asian, and 1.8% other ethnicities. People may identify with more than one ethnicity.

The percentage of people born overseas was 15.8, compared with 27.1% nationally.

Although some people chose not to answer the census's question about religious affiliation, 51.4% had no religion, 36.1% were Christian, 0.6% had Māori religious beliefs, 0.6% were Hindu, 0.6% were Muslim, 0.5% were Buddhist and 1.7% had other religions.

Of those at least 15 years old, 315 (19.2%) people had a bachelor's or higher degree, and 309 (18.8%) people had no formal qualifications. The median income was $38,400, compared with $31,800 nationally. 408 people (24.8%) earned over $70,000 compared to 17.2% nationally. The employment status of those at least 15 was that 849 (51.6%) people were employed full-time, 255 (15.5%) were part-time, and 54 (3.3%) were unemployed.

References

Populated places in the Auckland Region
Populated places around the Hauraki Gulf / Tīkapa Moana
Bays of the Auckland Region